Signal Festival is a four-day festival of light art and emerging technologies in Prague, Czech Republic. Held annually in October, lighting designers from the Czech Republic and abroad create lighting installations in streets and public spaces across the city, including famous historical landmarks.

SIGNAL has become the biggest cultural event in the Czech Republic in five years of its existence. Its unique integration of art, city space, and modern technology has drawn over 2 million attendees to Prague in overall. The festival brings visually attractive works together with complex installations of international quality. Its concept allows it to appeal both to professionals and general public. With its support of new works of art, the SIGNAL Festival has become a respected platform on an international scale and a sought-after venue for introducing the newest projects of the field. The financing of the festival is drawn from the support of grant programs such as those of the Magistrate of the Capital City of Prague, the Ministry of Regional Development, and the municipal districts involved, as well as through partnership with commercial entities and revenues from the auxiliary activities of the festival.

History 
The festival was the idea of producer Martin Pošta, curator Jan Rolník and artist Amar Mulabegovic from the group of artists The Macula. After the success of video mapping which was realized in 2010 by The Macula group and Martin Pošta on the occasion of the 600th anniversary of the Prague astronomical clock an idea of a large-scale performance in the field of light art in the Czech Republic by means of a festival occurred. Preparing the first year took 3 years in total. The organizers succeeded in bringing the most famous names in the field from all over the world and with the kind support of the capital city of Prague, and the municipal districts of Praha 1 and Praha 2, as well as other partners they started the light festival tradition.

2013 
The festival was first held in October 2013, and attracted around 250,000 visitors. Local landmarks used for projections included Charles Bridge, the Church of St. Ludmila at Náměstí Míru and the Petřín Lookout Tower. Entry to the festival was free, but certain exhibits required special glasses, which were sold for 30 CZK.

2014 
The 2014 festival, beginning on 17 October 2014, attracted around 460,000 visitors, and was listed as one of Europe’s top 10 light art festivals by The Guardian in September 2014.

2015 
The 2015 festival began on 15 October 2015, and included for the first time an educational platform, named Transmit, intended for light design specialists, artists and other professionals from the light and digital design field, as well as a spherical dome,  the Signal Dome, located on Klárov, the only pay-to-enter installation. The Signal Dome consisted of a 15-minute spherical projection by French artist Joanie Lemercier, entitled Nimbes.

2016 
The fourth year of the festival, from 13–16 October, attracted 578,137 people according to data collected by Cisco Systems, partner of the festival. For the first time, the festival included a daytime program, aimed primarily at children, consisting of a spherical projection, Charles IV, by Jan Šíma, projected in the Signal Dome every day, from 9:30 a.m. to 6:30 p.m. The 2016 festival consisted of 23 installations (15 light installations, 4 videomappings or spherical projections and 4 interactive installations) created by artists from 11 countries. The installations were located mainly in Prague 1, but also in Prague 2 and Prague 3. Two thirds of installations at the festival were presented as their world or European premieres. The festival was free admission except for the two installations (SIGNAL Dome and videomapping in Tyršův dům).

2017 
The Signal Festival’s fifth edition was held between 12 and 15 October. As part of its anniversary, the Festival prepared some new things for its visitors. For the first time, there were two routes, the traditional one at the Old Town and the New Town (the Downtown route) and the other one was newly organized at Vinohrady, in Praha 2 and Praha 3 (the Vinohrady route). Part of the festival is now also the SIGNAL Gallery Zone of the festival which is subject to charge and which contained four indoor installations located in the Downtown route. The Gallery Zone entrance fee was CZK 100. Another new thing was the SIGNAL CALLING section where Czech promising authors’ installations were introduced. The program department was choosing installations from an open call and the section was meant to support the art of emerging artists or artists from the Czech Republic who have not been established yet. SIGNAL introduced works of Milena Dopitová’s atelier at the Academy of Fine Arts in Prague, group of artists Blok_4 or group of young artists Heardt with the installation of the same name, the premiere of which was at the prestigious Burning Man festival in Nevada. As part of its 5th anniversary, the SIGNAL festival repeated all videomapping projections, which were shown at the Cathedral of St Ludmila in the Peace square (náměstí Míru). Five videomapping projections took nearly forty minutes and people could go to see them every festival evening starting from 11 p.m.

Awards 
The festival was included among the top priority cultural events of Prague and the Czech Republic by the city authorities and the Czech Ministry of Culture in 2016.

The Guardian put SIGNAL Festival among 10 best light festivals in Europe.

Singapore daily The Straits Times chose SIGNAL among 8 most interesting light festivals in the world in 2017.

Travel portal Orbitz.com presented SIGNAL as one of 7 mindbending light art festivals.  SIGNAL was also part of the Flightnetwork.com chart of 36 best world events.

Other activities 
The festival organizers have also established the SIGNALlab creative centre, in Holešovice Hall No. 40, organised a second annual Transmit conference, held in March 2017.

See also
 Designblok

References

External links 
 

Festivals in Prague
Autumn events in the Czech Republic